Luyt is the name of

 Dennis Luyt (born c. 1963), Dutch Commander of the Royal Netherlands Air Force
 Frederick Luyt (1888–1965), South African rugby union player and cricketer
  (1655–1721), Dutch mathematician and physicist
 Louis Luyt (1932–2013), South African business tycoon and politician
 Richard Luyt (1915–1994), South African-born Governor of British Guiana
 Syd Luyt (1925–2010), South African marathon runner

See also
Luyten (surname), surname of similar origin